Modern pentathlon at the 2014 Summer Youth Olympics was held from 22 to 26 August at the Nanjing Olympic Sports Centre in Nanjing, China.

Qualification

Each National Olympic Committee (NOC) can enter a maximum of 2 competitors, 1 per each gender. As hosts, China was initially given the maximum quota, but only selected a female athlete and a further 4, 2 in each gender was initially given to the Tripartite Commission, but none were selected. The spots were reallocated to the world rankings. The remaining 42 places shall be decided in three stages; firstly four continental qualification tournaments held in 2013, second the 2014 World Youth A Championships and finally the Olympic Youth A Pentathlon World Rankings.

Each athlete will compete in both the individual and mixed events. To be eligible to participate at the Youth Olympics athletes must have been born between 1 January 1996 and 31 December 1999.

Boys

Girls

Schedule

The schedule was released by the Nanjing Youth Olympic Games Organizing Committee.

All times are CST (UTC+8)

Medal summary

Medal table

Events

References

External links
Official Results Book – Modern Pentathlon

 
2014 Summer Youth Olympics events
Youth Summer Olympics
2014
Modern pentathlon competitions in China